The following is a list of awards and nominations received by actor Denzel Washington.

Washington has received ten Academy Award nominations winning once for Best Supporting Actor for his performance in the Edward Zwick Civil War film Glory (1989), and Best Actor for Antoine Fuqua's crime thriller Training Day (2001). He has also received two Tony Award nominations for his work on the Broadway stage. He won the Tony Award for Best Actor in a Play for his performance as Troy Maxon in the August Wilson play Fences (2010). He has also received two Primetime Emmy Award nominations for his work in television and a Grammy Award nomination.

He has received nine Golden Globe Award nominations winning twice for his performances in Glory (1989) and The Hurricane (1999). He received the Golden Globe Cecil B. DeMille Award in 2016. He has also received seven Screen Actors Guild Award nominations winning for Best Actor for his performance in the film adaptation of Fences (2015) which he also directed.

Washington is one of eight actors who has been nominated for an acting Academy Award in five different decades (1980s, '90s. 2000s, '10s and '20s), joining Laurence Olivier, Katharine Hepburn, Paul Newman, Jack Nicholson, Michael Caine, Meryl Streep and Frances McDormand.

Major associations

Academy Awards

Berlin International Film Festival

Golden Globe Awards

Grammy Awards

Primetime Emmy Awards

Tony Awards

Screen Actors Guild Awards

Additional awards

Black Reel Awards

MTV Movie & TV Awards

NAACP Image Awards

Satellite Awards

Film critic awards

Miscellaneous awards

Notes

References

Washington, Denzel